John C. Munro may refer to:
 John Munro (Canadian politician) (John Carr Munro), member of parliament for Hamilton, Ontario
 John Campbell Munro, Scottish-born Australian folk musician
 John C. Munro (clipper), an iron full-rigged ship built in 1862

See also
 John Munro (disambiguation)